Qarash Qa Tappehsi, also rendered as Qarash Qatepsi, may refer to:
 Qarash Qa Tappehsi-ye Olya
 Qarash Qa Tappehsi-ye Sofla